The 2021 Coastal Carolina Chanticleers softball team represented Coastal Carolina University during the 2020 NCAA Division I softball season. The Chanticleers played their home games at St. John Stadium – Charles Wade-John Lott Field. The Chanticleers were led by twelfth-year head coach Kelley Green and were members of the Sun Belt Conference.

Preseason

Sun Belt Conference Coaches Poll
The Sun Belt Conference Coaches Poll was released on February 8, 2021. Coastal Carolina was picked to finish fourth in the Sun Belt Conference with 68 votes.

Preseason All-Sun Belt team
Summer Ellyson (LA, SR, Pitcher)
Leanna Johnson (TROY, SO, Pitcher)
Allisa Dalton (LA, SR, Shortstop/3rd Base)
Katie Webb (TROY, SR, Infielder/1st Base)
Raina O'Neal (LA, JR, Outfielder)
Julie Raws (LA, SR, Catcher)
Courtney Dean (CCU, SR, Outfielder)
Mekhia Freeman (GASO, SR, Outfielder)
Korie Kreps (ULM, JR, Outfielder)
Kaitlyn Alderink (LA, SR, 2nd Base)
Jade Gortarez (LA, SR, Shortstop/3rd Base)
Ciara Bryan (LA, SR, Outfielder)
Kelly Horne (TROY, SO, Infielder/2nd Base)
Makiya Thomas (CCU, SR, Outfielder/Infielder)
Tara Oltmann (TXST, SR, Infielder/Shortstop)
Jayden Mount (ULM, SR, Infielder)
Katie Lively (TROY, SO, Outfielder)

National Softball Signing Day

Roster

Coaching staff

Schedule and results

{| class="toccolours" width=95% style="clear:both; margin:1.5em auto; text-align:center;"
|-
! colspan=2 style="" | 2021 Coastal Carolina Chanticleers softball game log
|-
! colspan=2 style="" | Regular season (21-23)
|- valign="top"
|

|-
|

|-
|
{| class="wikitable collapsible " style="margin:auto; width:100%; text-align:center; font-size:95%"
! colspan=12 style="padding-left:4em;" | April (11–6)
|-
! Date
! Opponent
! Rank
! Site/stadium
! Score
! Win
! Loss
! Save
! TV
! Attendance
! Overall record
! SBC record
|- align="center" bgcolor=#ffdddd
|Apr. 1 || at RV Texas State || || Bobcat Softball Complex • San Marcos, TX || L 5-6 || Mullins (11-2) || Beasley-Polko (5-7) || King (2) || || 263 || 8-14 || 1-6
|- align="center" bgcolor=#ffdddd
|Apr. 2 || at RV Texas State || || Bobcat Softball Complex • San Marcos, TX || L 1-5 || King (6-1) || De Jesus (2-5) || None || || 263 || 8-15 || 1-7
|- align="center" bgcolor=#ffdddd
|Apr. 2 || at RV Texas State || || Bobcat Softball Complex • San Marcos, TX || L 2-3 || King (7-1) || Brabham (1-4) || None || || 244 || 8-16 || 1-8
|- align="center" bgcolor=#ddffdd
|Apr. 9 || Georgia Southern || || St. John Stadium – Charles Wade-John Lott Field • Conway, SC || W 5-3 || Brabham (2-5) || Rewis (1-2) || None || ESPN+ || 125 || 9-16 || 2-8
|- align="center" bgcolor=#ffdddd
|Apr. 10 || Georgia Southern || || St. John Stadium – Charles Wade-John Lott Field • Conway, SC || L 1-9 (6 inns) || Richardson (3-4) || De Jesus (2-6) || None || ESPN+ || 125 || 9-17 || 2-9
|- align="center" bgcolor=#ffdddd
|Apr. 10 || Georgia Southern || || St. John Stadium – Charles Wade-John Lott Field • Conway, SC || L 6-7 || Waldrep (3-4) || Brabham (2-5) || Rewis (1) || ESPN+ || 124 || 9-18 || 2-10
|- align="center" bgcolor=#ddffdd
|Apr. 13 || at College of Charleston || || Patriots Point Athletics Complex • Charleston, SC || W 14-3 (5 inns) || Beasley-Polko (6-7) || Lemire (1-9) || None || || 64 || 10-18 ||
|- align="center" bgcolor=#ddffdd
|Apr. 13 || at College of Charleston || || Patriots Point Athletics Complex • Charleston, SC || W 14-2 (5 inns) || Brabham (3-5) || Burke (1-7) || None || || 64 || 11-18 ||
|- align="center" bgcolor=#ffdddd
|Apr. 17 || at Georgia State || || Robert E. Heck Softball Complex • Decatur, GA || L 2-3 (9 inns) || Mooney (6-8) || Beasley-Polko (6-8) || None || || 213 || 11-19 || 2-11
|- align="center" bgcolor=#ddffdd
|Apr. 17 || at Georgia State || || Robert E. Heck Softball Complex • Decatur, GA || W 6-3 || Brabham (4-5) || Doolittle (0-4) || None || || 213 || 12-19 || 3-11
|- align="center" bgcolor=#ddffdd
|Apr. 18 || at Georgia State || || Robert E. Heck Softball Complex • Decatur, GA || W 8-7 || Beasley-Polko (7-8) || Freeman (2-3) || None || || 217 || 13-19 || 4-11
|- align="center" bgcolor=#ddffdd
|Apr. 21 || Campbell || || St. Johns Stadium – Charles Wade-John Lott Field • Conway, SC || W 7-6 (8 inns) || Beasley-Polko (8-8) || Barefoot (10-5) || None || || 125 || 14-19 ||
|- align="center" bgcolor=#ddffdd
|Apr. 21 || Campbell || || St. Johns Stadium – Charles Wade-John Lott Field • Conway, SC || W 6-4 || De Jesus (3-6) || Richards (5-3) || Beasley-Polko (1) || || 125 || 15-19 ||
|- align="center" bgcolor=#ddffdd
|Apr. 24 || UT Arlington || || St. John Stadium – Charles Wade-John Lott Field • Conway, SC || W 8-5 || Beasley-Polko (9-8) || Valencia (3-5) || Brabham (1) ||  ESPN+ || 125 || 16-19 || 5-11
|- align="center" bgcolor=#ddffdd
|Apr. 24 || UT Arlington || || St. John Stadium – Charles Wade-John Lott Field • Conway, SC || W 6-1 || De Jesus (4-6) || Hines (4-11) || None || ESPN+ || 125 || 17-19 || 6-11
|- align="center" bgcolor=#ddffdd
|Apr. 25 || UT Arlington || || St. John Stadium – Charles Wade-John Lott Field • Conway, SC || W 5-2 || Brabham (5-6) || Valencia (3-6) || None || ESPN+ || 125 || 18-19 || 7-11
|- align="center" bgcolor=#dddddd
|Apr. 27 || at  || || Terry Field • Rock Hill, SC || colspan=12| Game canceled|- align="center" bgcolor=#dddddd
|Apr. 27 || at Winthrop || || Terry Field • Rock Hill, SC || colspan=12| Game canceled''
|- align="center" bgcolor=#ddffdd
|Apr. 28 || at  || || Boseman Field • Wilmington, NC || W 12-5 || De Jesus (5-6) || Gamache (2-6) || Brabham (2) || || 73 || 19-19 ||
|}
|-
|

|-
! colspan=2 style="" | Post-Season (0-1)
|-
|

|}Schedule Source:*Rankings are based on the team's current ranking in the NFCA/USA Softball poll.

Posteason

Conference Accolades 
Player of the Year: Ciara Bryan – LA
Pitcher of the Year: Summer Ellyson – LA
Freshman of the Year: Sara Vanderford – TXST
Newcomer of the Year: Ciara Bryan – LA
Coach of the Year: Gerry Glasco – LAAll Conference First TeamCiara Bryan (LA)
Summer Ellyson (LA)
Sara Vanderford (TXST)
Leanna Johnson (TROY)
Jessica Mullins (TXST)
Olivia Lackie (USA)
Kj Murphy (UTA)
Katie Webb (TROY)
Jayden Mount (ULM)
Kandra Lamb (LA)
Kendall Talley (LA)
Meredith Keel (USA)
Tara Oltmann (TXST)
Jade Sinness (TROY)
Katie Lively (TROY)All Conference Second TeamKelly Horne (TROY)
Meagan King (TXST)
Mackenzie Brasher (USA)
Bailee Wilson (GASO)Makiya Thomas (CCU)Kaitlyn Alderink (LA)
Abby Krzywiecki (USA)
Kenzie Longanecker (APP)
Alissa Dalton (LA)
Julie Rawls (LA)
Korie Kreps (ULM)Kayla Rosado (CCU)Justice Milz (LA)
Gabby Buruato (APP)
Arieann Bell (TXST)References:'''

References

Coastal Carolina
Coastal Carolina softball
Coastal Carolina Chanticleers softball seasons